Prague has a local-government structure of two or three tiers, depending on the area of town. At the top is the Magistrate of the Capital City of Prague, which is responsible for public transport; waste collection; municipal police; firefighting; ambulance services; cultural activities; care of historical sites; the Prague Zoo; and other activities of citywide significance.

Prague is divided into 10 municipal districts (1-10), 22 administrative districts (1-22), 57 municipal parts, or 112 cadastral areas.

Since 1990, the city has been divided into 56 (since 1992, 57) self-governing municipal parts. The parts are responsible for parks and environmental protection; ordering equipment for schools and volunteer firefighters; some cultural and sports activities; activities for seniors; some social and health programs; cemeteries; and collection of fees for dog tags and the like. Another important activity of the municipal parts is the ownership, maintenance and, sometimes, sale of public property, especially public housing.

Since 2001, the 57 municipal parts have been grouped into 22 numbered administrative districts, for national-government purposes. One administrative district has responsibility for providing certain services for the municipal parts. Those services include providing business licenses, identity cards and passports. The administrative district with such responsibility sometimes shares a name with the municipal part it serves. For example, the administrative district of Prague 19 provides those services to the municipal parts of Prague 19 (Kbely), Prague-Satalice and Prague-Vinoř. Residents of Satalice can get dog tags in their neighborhood but must go to Kbely, home of the Prague 19 government, to get an identity card.

Both the citywide government and the municipal districts have elected councils and mayors. The mayor of the Capital City of Prague is known as the primátor, which is sometimes translated into English as "lord mayor" (even though the Czech title carries no connotations of nobility).

Since 1960, Prague has been divided into 10 municipal districts. Those 10 districts are still used for addressing and transportation purposes and, for example, the organisation of courts and prosecutions. Street signs usually reflects the name of a municipal district and additionally add the name of the cadastral area. Thus, a sign in Kbely will say "Praha 9-Kbely," not "Praha 19." Prague residents are much more likely to use the name of a cadastral area, than the name of an administrative district in everyday communication.

Table of administrative and municipal districts

Notes: 
 In 2001, the Czech government ordered that every municipal district that serves an entire administrative district should be named for the administrative district that it serves. Thus, the municipal districts of Radotín, Řepy, Letňany, Kbely, Horní Počernice, Újezd nad Lesy and Uhříněves are now Prague 16 through 22, respectively. The old names remain as the names of cadastral areas.
 All named districts officially begin with "Prague-", or "Praha-" in Czech. Thus, for example, the official name of Kunratice is "Prague-Kunratice" or "Praha-Kunratice".

List of cadastral areas

Key: Cadastral area (year joined to Prague) – municipal district

 Hradčany (1784) – Prague 1, Prague 6
 Malá Strana ("Lesser Town" or "Little Quarter") (1784) – Prague 1, Prague 5
 Nové Město (New Town) (1784) – Prague 1, Prague 2, Prague 8
 Staré Město (Old Town) (1784) – Prague 1
 Josefov (Jewish Quarter) (1854) – Prague 1
 Vyšehrad (1883) – Prague 2
 Holešovice (1884) – Prague 1, Prague 7
 Libeň (1901) – Prague 7, Prague 8, Prague 9
 Bohnice (1922) – Prague 8
 Braník (1922) – Prague 4
 Břevnov (1922) – Prague 5, Prague 6
 Bubeneč (1922) – Prague 6, Prague 7
 Dejvice (1922) – Prague 6
 Hloubětín (1922) – Prague 9, Prague 14
 Hlubočepy (1922) – Prague 5
 Hodkovičky (1922) – Prague 4
 Hostivař (1922) – Prague 15
 Hrdlořezy (1922) – Prague 9, Prague 10
 Jinonice (1922) – Prague 5, Prague 13
 Karlín (1922) – Prague 8
 Kobylisy (1922) – Prague 8
 Košíře (1921) – Prague 5
 Krč (1922) – Prague 4
 Liboc (1922) – Prague 6
 Lhotka (1922) – Prague 4
 Malá Chuchle (1922) – Velká Chuchle
 Malešice (1922) – Prague 9, Prague 10
 Michle (1922) – Prague 4, Prague 10
 Motol (1922) – Prague 5
 Nusle (1922) – Prague 2, Prague 4
 Podolí (1922) – Prague 4
 Prosek (1922) – Prague 9
 Radlice (1922) – Prague 5
 Smíchov (1922) – Prague 5
 Sedlec (1922) – Prague 6, Suchdol
 Strašnice (1922) – Prague 3, Prague 10
 Střešovice (1922) – Prague 6
 Střížkov (1922) – Prague 8, Prague 9
 Troja (1922) – Troja, Prague 7
 Veleslavín (1922) – Prague 6
 Vinohrady (1922) – Prague 1, Prague 2, Prague 3, Prague 10
 Vokovice (1922) – Prague 6
 Vršovice (1922) – Prague 4, Prague 10
 Vysočany (1922) – Prague 3, Prague 9
 Záběhlice (1922) – Prague 4, Prague 10
 Žižkov (1922) – Prague 3, Prague 10
 Čimice (1960) – Prague 8
 Ruzyně (1960) – Prague 6
 Ďáblice (1960/68) – Ďáblice
 Dolní Chabry (1960/68) – Dolní Chabry
 Holyně (1960/68) – Slivenec
 Kunratice (1960/68) – Kunratice
 Lysolaje (1960/68) – Lysolaje
 Řeporyje (1960/68/74) – Řeporyje, Prague 13
 Čakovice (1968) – Čakovice
 Dolní Měcholupy (1968) – Dolní Měcholupy, Dubeč
 Horní Měcholupy (1968) – Prague 15
 Letňany (1968) – Prague 18
 Libuš (1968) – Libuš
 Kbely (1968) – Prague 19
 Kyje (1968) – Prague 14
 Komořany (1968) – Prague 12
 Miškovice (1968) – Čakovice
 Modřany (1968) – Prague 12
 Nebušice (1968) – Nebušice
 Štěrboholy (1968) – Štěrboholy
 Třeboradice (1968) – Čakovice
 Velká Chuchle (1968) – Velká Chuchle
 Háje (1968/74) – Prague 11
 Petrovice (1968/74) – Petrovice
 Přední Kopanina (1968/74) – Přední Kopanina
 Běchovice (1974) – Běchovice
 Benice (1974) – Benice
 Březiněves (1974) – Březiněves
 Dolní Počernice (1974) – Dolní Počernice
 Dubeč (1974) – Dubeč
 Hájek (1974) – Uhříněves
 Horní Počernice – Prague 20
 Hostavice (1974) – Prague 14
 Chodov (1974) – Prague 11
 Cholupice (1974) – Prague 12
 Klánovice (1974) – Klánovice
 Královice (1974) – Královice
 Koloděje (1974) – Koloděje
 Kolovraty (1974) – Kolovraty
 Křeslice (1974) – Křeslice
 Lahovice (1974) – Zbraslav
 Lipany (1974) – Kolovraty
 Lipence (1974) – Lipence
 Lochkov (1974) – Lochkov
 Nedvězí (1974) – Nedvězí
 Písnice (1974) – Libuš
 Pitkovice (1974) – Uhříněves, Křeslice
 Radotín (1974) – Radotín
 Řepy (1974) – Prague 6, Prague 17
 Satalice (1974) – Satalice
 Slivenec (1974) – Slivenec
 Sobín (1974) – Zličín
 Stodůlky (1974) – Prague 13, Řeporyje
 Suchdol (1974) – Suchdol
 Točná (1974) – Prague 12
 Třebonice (1974) – Prague 13, Řeporyje, Zličín
 Uhříněves (1974) – Uhříněves
 Újezd nad Lesy (1974) – Prague 21
 Újezd u Průhonic (1974) – Újezd u Průhonic
 Vinoř (1974) – Vinoř
 Zadní Kopanina (1974) – Řeporyje
 Zbraslav (1974) – Zbraslav
 Zličín (1974) – Zličín
 Černý Most (formed in 1988 from parts of Kyje, Hostavice, Dolní Počernice and Horní Počernice) – Prague 14
 Kamýk (formed in 1989 from parts of Lhotka and Libuš) – Prague 12

Source: Cities and towns in Bohemia, Moravia and Silesia (volume 5)

Other areas
Beyond the 111 cadastral areas named above, many other Prague settlements, quarters and housing estates are perceived as districts, although they do not constitute their own cadastral areas. Examples: Barrandov, Spořilov, Sídliště Košík, Zahradní Město, Pankrác, Letná, Bubny, Zlíchov, Klíčov, Butovice, Klukovice, Kačerov, Jenerálka, Šárka, Strahov, Chodovec, Litochleby, Dubeček, Lázeňka, Netluky, Zmrzlík, Cikánka, Kateřinky, Hrnčíře, Pitkovičky, Lahovičky, Dolní Černošice, Kazín, Závist, Baně, Strnady, and many others.

The biggest panelák complexes are Jižní Město ("South City"), Severní Město ("North City") and Jihozápadní Město ("Southwest City"), all of which consist of partial housing estates. Most of Prague's panelák estates that were built between the 1960s and 1980s have names that incorporate the Czech word sídliště, which refers to a post-World War 2 eastern bloc housing estate. Many local names originated from names of historic villages in today's Prague area.

Symbols

Flags

Coats of arms

See also
ISO 3166-2:CZ, ISO subdivisions codes for the Czech Republic (include codes for districts of Prague)

References

External links
 Map of Prague administrative and municipal districts from the Czech Statistical Office
 Description of 2001 local-government reform in Prague from Prague 19 (in Czech)